The Baltic Times is an independent monthly newspaper that covers the latest political, economic, business, and cultural events in Estonia, Latvia and Lithuania.

The paper was formed from a merger in 1996 of the Baltic Independent and Baltic Observer. With offices in Tallinn and Vilnius and its headquarters in Riga, The Baltic Times remains the only English language print and online newspaper covering all three Baltic states.

Between 1996 and 2012 The Baltic Times was published weekly and then, until September 2013, twice a month.

References

External links
 The Baltic Times
 Library of Congress

Newspapers published in Estonia
Newspapers published in Latvia
Newspapers published in Lithuania
Newspapers established in 1996
Mass media in Riga
1996 establishments in Latvia
Latvian news websites